Ronald Ogier Ward (6 March 1886 4 April 1971) was a British urologist, past president of the urology section of the Royal Society of Medicine and the first president of the British Association of Urological Surgeons (BAUS). In 1951, together with Terence Millin, he received the St Peter's Medal.

References 

1886 births
British urologists
1971 deaths
Recipients of the St Peter's Medal